The Old Vicksburg Bridge, also known as Mississippi River Bridge, is a cantilever bridge carrying one rail line across the Mississippi River between Delta, Louisiana and Vicksburg, Mississippi.

History

Until 1998, the bridge was open to motor vehicles and carried U.S. Route 80 (US 80) across the Mississippi River.  It is now only a railroad bridge, though one road lane runs through the bridge for inspection by workers.  It was replaced by the new Vicksburg Bridge, a short distance down river, for vehicle crossings.

It was listed on the National Register of Historic Places in 1989.

It was built by the Vicksburg Bridge & Terminal Co. during 1928-1930 and has three cantilevered truss spans and three Parker truss spans.

During the period when the bridge was open to regular traffic a rather unusual system was used to handle the tractor-trailer truck traffic which used the bridge.  Located at each end of the bridge, there were a pair of railroad styled signal towers, which required trucks to stop.  At one time trucks were allowed to traverse the bridge along with other vehicle and train traffic.  In order to do this the truck driver would pull the passenger side mirror in and then position his front passenger side tire against a rail located just off the roadway surface.  Using this method trucks could meet and pass each other while traveling east or west.  The most unnerving was going east and meeting a train moving westward on the trucks passenger side and another truck west bound on the drivers side.  The signal towers prevented this from occurring anymore.  Once stopped, the towers would close off traffic for all vehicles in both directions, and then allow trucks to cross the bridge alone, using the full width of both of the narrow lanes, as opposed to staying in just one lane.  Due to numerous safety concerns, crossings by trucks were limited to day time only operation, with trucks being required to wait until dawn before being allowed on the bridge. t

See also
 
 
 
 
 List of crossings of the Lower Mississippi River
 National Register of Historic Places listings in Madison Parish, Louisiana
 National Register of Historic Places listings in Warren County, Mississippi

References

Bridges over the Mississippi River
Road-rail bridges in the United States
Bridges completed in 1930
Railroad bridges on the National Register of Historic Places in Louisiana
Railroad bridges on the National Register of Historic Places in Mississippi
Road bridges on the National Register of Historic Places in Louisiana
Road bridges on the National Register of Historic Places in Mississippi
Kansas City Southern Railway bridges
Illinois Central Railroad
Buildings and structures in Vicksburg, Mississippi
1930 establishments in Louisiana
National Register of Historic Places in Madison Parish, Louisiana
U.S. Route 80
Cantilever bridges in the United States
Parker truss bridges in the United States
1930 establishments in Mississippi
Interstate vehicle bridges in the United States
National Register of Historic Places in Warren County, Mississippi